David Harold Jenkins (born Belfast, 19 October 1961) is the current Archdeacon of Sudbury.

Jenkins was educated at the Belfast Royal Academy, Sidney Sussex College, Cambridge and Ripon College Cuddesdon. He was ordained in 1990  and after curacies at Chesterton and Earley held two incumbencies in Blackpool and Broughton. He was then Director of Education for the Diocese of Carlisle and a Canon Residentiary at Carlisle Cathedral until his archdeacon’s appointment.

References

1961 births
Clergy from Belfast
Alumni of Sidney Sussex College, Cambridge
Alumni of Ripon College Cuddesdon
People educated at the Belfast Royal Academy
Archdeacons of Sudbury
Living people